Habrocestum gibbosum is a jumping spider species that lives in the Yemen. It was first described in 2007.

References

Salticidae
Spiders described in 2007
Spiders of Asia
Spiders of the Arabian Peninsula
Taxa named by Wanda Wesołowska